Paul Stewart (born Paul Sternberg; March 13, 1908 – February 17, 1986) was an American character actor, director and producer who worked in theatre, radio, films and television. He frequently portrayed cynical and sinister characters throughout his career.

A friend and associate of Orson Welles for many years, Stewart helped Welles get his first job in radio and was associate producer of the celebrated radio program "The War of the Worlds", in which he also performed. One of the Mercury Theatre players who made their film debut in Welles's landmark film Citizen Kane, Stewart portrayed Kane's butler and valet, Raymond. He appeared in 50 films, and performed in or directed some 5,000 radio and television shows.

Biography
Paul Stewart was born in Manhattan, New York, on March 13, 1908, as Paul Sternberg. His parents were Maurice D. Sternberg, a salesman and credit agent for a textile manufacturer, and Nathalie C. (née Nathanson) Sternberg; both were born in Minneapolis. Stewart attended public school and completed two years at Columbia University, studying law. He had received first place in the Belasco Theatre Tournament in 1925 and decided on an acting career.

Stewart began his stage career in New York as teenager. He made his Broadway debut in 1930, in Subway Express. He next appeared in the 1931 play, Two Seconds, adapted as a film the next year.

In 1932, after two additional Broadway credits, Stewart moved to Cincinnati and went to work at radio station WLW. There, in 1928, radio pioneer Fred Smith had created the program Newscasting, which in 1931 evolved into the popular national news series, The March of Time. For 13 months Stewart worked in all aspects of radio production at WLW – acting, announcing, directing, producing, writing and creating sound effects. When he returned to New York he was on The March of Time and a member of radio's elite corps of actors.

In 1934, Stewart introduced Orson Welles to director Knowles Entrikin, who gave Welles his first job on radio, on The American School of the Air. "I'd been turning up for auditions and never landing a job until I met Paul Stewart," Welles recalled. "He's a lovely man; for years he was one of the main pillars of our Mercury broadcasts. He can't be given too much credit."

In March 1935 Stewart saw Welles's stage performance in Archibald MacLeish's verse play Panic, and recommended him to director Homer Fickett. Welles was auditioned and hired to join the repertory company that presented The March of Time.

"It was like a stock company, whose members were the aristocrats of this relatively new profession of radio acting," wrote fellow actor Joseph Julian. At that time Julian had to content himself with being an indistinguishable voice in crowd scenes, envying this "hallowed circle" that included Stewart, Welles, Kenny Delmar, Arlene Francis, Gary Merrill, Agnes Moorehead, Jeanette Nolan, Everett Sloane, Richard Widmark, Art Carney, Ray Collins, Pedro de Cordoba, Ted de Corsia, Juano Hernandez, Nancy Kelly, John McIntire, Jack Smart and Dwight Weist. The March of Time was one of radio's most popular shows.

Stewart was a founder of the American Federation of Radio Artists in August 1937, and one of its inaugural officers. He carried card number 39 in the union and was a frequent delegate at the national convention. He was also a board member of the Screen Actors Guild, and a member of the Directors Guild of America and the Academy of Motion Picture Arts and Sciences.

Stewart played various roles throughout Welles's memorable tenure as Lamont Cranston in The Shadow (September 1937–September 1938).

In 1938 Welles expanded the range of the Mercury Theatre from Broadway to network radio with his CBS series, The Mercury Theatre on the Air, and Stewart became his associate producer. In addition to playing a number of roles in the drama series and its sponsored continuation, The Campbell Playhouse, Stewart made significant contributions to the celebrated broadcast, "The War of the Worlds", as rehearsal director, actor and co-writer.

Welles later said that Stewart deserved the largest share of the credit for the quality of "The War of the Worlds".

On January 14, 1939, in Arlington, Virginia, Stewart married actress and singer Peg LaCentra (1910–1996), a vocalist with Artie Shaw's first orchestra who worked in radio, films and television. That September Welles called Stewart in New York.

"The telephone rang and I heard the unmistakable voice of Orson Welles, speaking from California," Stewart recalled:Well, when Orson said he had a part for you, you went. So I left New York to play my first role in a picture at 500 dollars a week, three weeks' guarantee. I was on Citizen Kane for 11 weeks. … My first shot was a close-up in which Orson wanted a special smoke effect from my cigarette. I was rigged with tube that went under my clothes and down my finger to the cigarette, but somehow the contraption wouldn't exude smoke. "I want long cigarettes – the Russian kind!" Orson ordered. Everyone waited while the prop man fetched some Russian cigarettes. Just before the scene Orson Welles warned me: "Your head is going to fill the screen at the Radio City Music Hall" – at that time Citizen Kane was booked for the Music Hall. Then he said in his gruff manner, "Turn 'em." But just before I started, he added quietly in his warm voice, "Good luck." I blew the first take. It was 30, 40 takes before I completed a shot that Orson liked – and I had only one line. That was almost 30 years ago, but even today I have people repeat it to me, including young students. The line was: "Rosebud … I'll tell you about Rosebud …"

Stewart's most famous role is his screen debut as Raymond, the cynical butler in Citizen Kane (1941). Actress Ruth Warrick, who portrayed Kane's first wife, remembered Stewart saying to her at the film's New York premiere, "From this night on, wherever we go or whatever we do in our lives, we will always be identified with Citizen Kane."

On the stage, Stewart appeared in the Mercury Theatre's acclaimed production of Native Son, directed by Welles and produced by John Houseman at the St. James Theatre March 24–June 28, 1941.

During World War II Stewart served with the New York-based Office of War Information (1941–43) and narrated documentaries including The World at War (1942). He worked under John Houseman at the newly created Voice of America (1942–43), broadcasting news, editorials and commentary from the U.S. press, and quotes from notable speeches, to audiences in Europe. When Houseman took his oath of allegiance as a U.S. citizen in March 1943, he chose Stewart to accompany him as his witness.

Stewart was given leave to go to Hollywood to act in a few wartime films, including Mr. Lucky (1943), and worked as a barker in The Mercury Wonder Show, a magic-and-variety show produced by Welles and Joseph Cotten as a morale-boosting entertainment for U.S. soldiers. Because of his comprehensive radio experience, Stewart was called upon by U.S. Treasury Secretary Henry Morgenthau, Jr. to prepare radio programs used to promote the purchase of War Bonds during World War II. He produced and directed Welles's Fifth War Loan broadcast from the Hollywood Bowl June 14, 1944, and produced, directed and acted in a number of patriotic episodes of the Cavalcade of America radio series.

After the war Stewart went to work for David O. Selznick and Dore Schary as a writer, director and producer, and directed screen tests for Paramount Pictures. Stewart's many feature film credits as an actor include The Window, Champion, Twelve O'Clock High, Deadline – U.S.A., The Bad and the Beautiful, The Juggler, Kiss Me Deadly, King Creole, In Cold Blood, The Day of the Locust and W.C. Fields and Me, in which he portrayed Florenz Ziegfeld.

In 1950 Stewart took over the role of Doc in Joshua Logan's Broadway production of Mister Roberts, starring Henry Fonda.

A Democrat, he campaigned for Adlai Stevenson in the 1952 presidential election.

On television, Stewart's director credits include the syndicated series, Top Secret (1954–55), in which he costarred with the young Gena Rowlands, and a notable episode of the TV series The Twilight Zone, "Little Girl Lost" (1962). He was host, narrator and actor in the syndicated series Deadline (1959–61) and appeared in episodes of The Ford Theatre Hour, Suspense, Playhouse 90, Alcoa Theatre, Alfred Hitchcock Presents, The Asphalt Jungle, Perry Mason, Dr. Kildare, Mannix, Mission Impossible, The Name of the Game ("L.A. 2017"), McMillan & Wife, Columbo, The Rockford Files, Lou Grant and Remington Steele, among many other TV series.

Orson Welles called upon Stewart to play a role in his film, The Other Side of the Wind, shot in the 1970s and left unfinished until its release in 2018. When Welles died at his home in Hollywood, California on October 10, 1985, Stewart was the first of his friends to arrive.

Stewart died at the age of 77 of heart failure at Cedars-Sinai Medical Center in Los Angeles on February 17, 1986, after a long illness.

He had suffered a heart attack in 1974 during the first two weeks' filming of Richard Brooks's Western, Bite the Bullet, in which he was replaced.

In the 1999 film RKO 281, Paul Stewart was portrayed by Adrian Schiller.

Theatre credits

Radio credits
Paul Stewart played in or directed 5,000 radio and TV shows, usually without credit.

Actor

Director, producer

Film and television credits

Actor

Director, producer

References

External links

"Native Son: Best-Selling Novel is Turned into Tense Drama Strikingly Staged by Orson Welles" Life, April 7, 1941, pp. 94–96Photograph of Stewart appears on page 95
War of the Worlds – An Update on the Paul Stewart lacquer set – Blog post about the acquisition and status of Paul Stewart's 78 rpm recordings of the Mercury Theatre on the Air broadcast of "The War of the Worlds" (October 27, 2013)

1908 births
1986 deaths
American male film actors
American male television actors
American male radio actors
American male stage actors
American radio directors
American radio producers
American television directors
Jewish American male actors
Male actors from New York City
20th-century American male actors
California Democrats
New York (state) Democrats
People of the United States Office of War Information
20th-century American Jews